The 2023 Pan American Cadets and Junior Fencing Championships were held in Bogotá, Colombia at the Palacio de los Deportes from March 1st to 7th, 2023.

Medal summary

Medal table

Junior

Men's events

Women's events

Cadets

Men's events

Women's events

References

Pan American Fencing Championships
Pan American Fencing Championships
Fencing in Colombia
International sports competitions hosted by Colombia
Pan American Cadets and Juniors Fencing Championships
Sports competitions in Bogotá